Jill Enfield (born August 8, 1954 in Miami Beach, Florida) is a photographer and hand coloring artist best known for her work in alternative photographic processes such as Cyanotype and Collodion process.  She has taught at The New School (Parsons Division), ICP, and New York University.

Works 

Enfield, Jill (2013). Jill Enfield's Guide to Photographic Alternative Processes.1st Edition.  Routledge Books. .
Enfield, Jill (2020). Jill Enfield's Guide to Photographic Alternative Processes.2nd Edition.  Routledge Books. .

References

1954 births
Living people
American photographers
American women photographers
21st-century American women